Augustus William Salve (December 29, 1885 – March 29, 1971) was an American Major League Baseball pitcher. He appeared in two games for the Philadelphia Athletics during the  season, once as a starter and once in relief.

References

Boxscores of relief appearance and of game started

Major League Baseball pitchers
Philadelphia Athletics players
Baseball players from Massachusetts
1885 births
1971 deaths
Richmond Colts players
Columbia Gamecocks players
Johnstown Johnnies players